David Herman Komansky (April 27, 1939 – September 27, 2021) was the former chairman and chief executive officer of Merrill Lynch & Company.

Career 
Komansky was born in Mount Vernon, New York, on April 27, 1939, and grew up in a family of Russian Jewish immigrants and Irish Catholics. 

He joined the U.S. Coast Guard and then attended the University of Miami School of Business at the University of Miami in 1965. 

Komansky joined Merrill Lynch in 1968 as a broker. He became a regional director in 1981 and an executive vice president in 1990. Komansky served as a director and chief executive officer of Merrill Lynch from December 1996 to December 2002, and as a director, president and chief operating officer of the firm from January 1995 to December 1996. Komansky retired as chairman from Merrill Lynch in July 2003.

Among many professional affiliations, he served as a director of BlackRock and as a member of the international advisory board of the British American Business Council. He was also a member of the board of directors of London-based WPP plc, a business conglomerate. Komansky was appointed to the board of trustees of NewYork-Presbyterian Hospital in New York City in 2001.

Philanthropy
In July 2005, Komansky established the Phyllis and David Komansky Center for Children's Health at Weill Cornell Medical Center in New York City to make medical care more accessible, advanced, and supportive of the needs of young patients and their families.

Personal life 
He was married and has two daughters, Jennifer and Elyssa.

He died of natural causes.

Footnotes

External links

"David Komansky" obituary at Legacy.com

1939 births
2021 deaths
Merrill (company) people
People from Mount Vernon, New York
University of Miami Business School alumni
American chief executives of financial services companies
American people of Irish descent
American people of Russian-Jewish descent